Vanahalli is a village in Dharwad district of Karnataka, India.

Demographics 
As of the 2011 Census of India there were 294 households in Vanahalli and a total population of 1,439 consisting of 769 males and 670 females. There were 169 children ages 0-6.

References

Villages in Dharwad district